Otonan is a ceremony (ceremonial birthday) carried out in Bali, Indonesia. Six months after a child is born, the ceremony is carried out according to the Wuku calendar of Bali, either during Sapta Wara, or Panca Wara. The purpose of this ceremony is to make up for the errors and evils of prior life to achieve a more perfect life.

References

Ceremonies in Indonesia